The Uruguayan pavilion houses Uruguay's national representation during the Venice Biennale arts festivals.

Background

Organization and building 

The pavilion was originally a warehouse built for the 1958 Biennale. It was adapted into a gallery space between 1960 and 1962.

Representation by year

Art 

 1954 — José Cuneo, Severino Pose
 1956 — Joaquín Torres García
 1960 — Zoma Baitler, Washington Barcala, Norberto Berdia, José Cuneo, José Echave, Adolfo Halty, Augusto Torres, Vicente Martìn, Julio Verdier (Commissioner: Jorge Pàez Vilaró)
 1962 — Germán Cabrera, Juan Ventayol
 1964 — Jorge Damiani, José Gamarra, Nelson Ramos, Jorge Páez Vilaró
 1968 — Antonio Frasconi (Commissioner: Angel Kalenberg)
 1970 — Taller de Montevideo (Armando Bergallo, Ernesto Vila, Héctor Vilche) (Commissioner: Angel Kalenberg)
 1972 — Luis A. Solari (Commissioner: Angel Kalenberg)
 1986 — Ernesto Aroztegui, Clever Lara (Commissioner: Angel Kalenberg)
 1988 — Luis Camnitzer (Commissioner: Angel Kalenberg)
 1990 — Gonzalo Fonseca (Commissioner: Angel Kalenberg)
 1993 — Águeda Dicancro
 1995 — Ignacio Iturria (Commissioner: Angel Kalenberg)
 1997 — Nelson Ramos
 1999 — Ricardo Pascale
 2001 — Rimer Cardillo (Commissioner: Cléver Lara)
 2003 — Pablo Atchugarry (Curator: Luciano Caramel)
 2005 — Lacy Duarte (Commissioners: Alicia Haber, Olga Larnaudie)
 2007 — Ernesto Vila (Commissioner: Enrique Aguerre)
 2009 — Raquel Bessio, Juan Burgos, Pablo Uribe (Commissioners: Patricia Bentancur, Alfredo Torres)
 2011 — Alejandro Cesarco, Magela Ferrero (Curator: Clio Bugel)
 2013 — Wifredo Díaz Valdéz (Curators: Carlos Capelán, Verónica Cordeiro)
 2015 — Marco Maggi (Curator: Patricia Bentancur)
 2017 — Mario Sagradini (Curator: Gabriel Peluffo Linari)

References

Bibliography

Further reading 

 
 
 
 

National pavilions